Drosera cityflora is a species of sundew, known for its unusually large flowers. It is native to southern Africa.

cistiflora
Carnivorous plants of Africa